Gigantopora is a genus of bryozoans belonging to the family Gigantoporidae.

The species of this genus are found in central Atlantic Ocean, Pacific Ocean, coasts of South African Republic.

Species
Species:

Gigantopora birostris 
Gigantopora cribraria 
Gigantopora duplicata 
Gigantopora elongata 
Gigantopora filiformis 
Gigantopora foraminosa 
Gigantopora grandis 
Gigantopora grandviewensis 
Gigantopora hexagonalis 
Gigantopora kirkpatricki 
Gigantopora lyncoides 
Gigantopora lyratostoma 
Gigantopora milenae 
Gigantopora minutiporosa 
Gigantopora modesta 
Gigantopora oropiscis 
Gigantopora perforata 
Gigantopora profunda 
Gigantopora proximalis 
Gigantopora pupa 
Gigantopora spathula 
Gigantopora spiculifera 
Gigantopora tuberculosa 
Gigantopora unirostris 
Gigantopora vartonensis 
Gigantopora verrucosissima

References

Bryozoan genera